Roundstone is an unincorporated community in Rockcastle County, in the U.S. state of Kentucky. It is located at the junction of U.S. Route 25, Kentucky Route 1786, and Kentucky Route 1617.

History
A post office called Roundstone was established in 1856, and remained in operation until 1893. The community took its name from nearby Roundstone Creek.

References

Unincorporated communities in Rockcastle County, Kentucky
Unincorporated communities in Kentucky